BETTERY Inc. was a privately held company based in Portland, Oregon. It provided a retail store-based reusable battery exchange service to consumers. BETTERY kiosks or "Swap Stations" allow consumers to buy ready to use reusable AA or AAA batteries that can be used just like any other single use battery. Once drained, the batteries can be swapped for a fully tested and charged replacement. The company previously had placed five kiosks at Whole Foods Market locations in the Pacific Northwest and placed five additional kiosks at Whole Foods and Safeway stores in Seattle and Portland. The BETTERY brand was sold in 2014 to Green Box Batteries, LLC, a Tacoma, WA privately held company. Green Box Batteries, LLC has re-launched the BETTERY brand with a focus on bringing batteries to the world of subscription services much like Netflix did for DVD rentals.

Environmental Impact 
Batteries account for >1% of waste poundage, but 88% of mercury, 52% of cadmium, and in total they account for 50-70% of all heavy metal contaminants in landfills including Zinc, Manganese, Lead, Nickel, Cobalt, Cadmium, Arsenic, and Mercury depending on the battery chemistry mix in a given landfill location. By using a reusable battery swap service, battery use has up to 30 times less impact on air pollutants (such as Carbon, Nitrogen, and Methane gases) than disposable batteries. That is equivalent to driving a car 1,243 miles less each year per consumer.

By making it easier for consumers to use reusable battery technology, The BETTERY brand reduces the volume of batteries that are thrown away in the U.S. every year. Approximately 90 percent of portable batteries manufactured in the US are alkaline dry cells with a global annual production exceeding 10 billion units. Today, the majority of these batteries end up in landfills.

Each BETTERY reusable battery can be swapped and reused up to a thousand times before it is recycled back into the manufacturing stream. Consumers can use the BETTERY kiosk to drop off traditional single-use batteries, where they will be recycled. The contents of recycled batteries can be salvaged to make metal and other raw materials.

History 
Founded in 2011 with the mission to reduce waste by utilizing the latest advancements in reusable battery technology, BETTERY belongs to the movement of companies with sustainability at its core. With a veteran team of executives and advisers from major battery, kiosk and high tech companies, BETTERY is poised to reinvent the portable power industry.

See also
 List of companies based in Oregon

References

External links 
 Bettery Inc.

Sustainable energy
Privately held companies based in Oregon
Companies based in Portland, Oregon
Companies established in 2011
2011 establishments in Oregon